Dalla genes is a species of butterfly in the family Hesperiidae. It is found in Bolivia, Peru, Colombia and Ecuador.

Subspecies
Dalla genes genes - Ecuador
Dalla genes golia Evans, 1955 - Peru
Dalla genes nona Evans, 1955 - Bolivia
Dalla genes saleca (Mabille, 1898) - Colombia

References

Butterflies described in 1898
genes
Hesperiidae of South America
Taxa named by Paul Mabille